Climax is the first album by Finland-based band Beastmilk.

Track listing
 "Death Reflects Us" - 2:49
 "The Wind Blows Through Their Skulls" - 2:24
 "Genocidal Crush" - 3:43
 "You Are Now Under Our Control" - 3:34
 "Ghosts Out of Focus" - 5:04
 "Nuclear Winter" - 3:37
 "Fear Your Mind" - 3:22
 "Love in a Cold World" - 3:45
 "Surf the Apocalypse" - 4:22
 "Strange Attractors" - 5:54

Personnel
Kvohst - lead vocals
Goatspeed - guitar
Arino - bass guitar
Paile - drums

References

2013 debut albums
Grave Pleasures albums